Viable but nonculturable (VBNC) bacteria refers as to bacteria that are in a state of very low metabolic activity and do not divide, but are alive and have the ability to become culturable once resuscitated.

Bacteria in a VBNC state cannot grow on standard growth media, though flow cytometry can measure the viability of the bacteria. Bacteria can enter the VBNC state as a response to stress, due to adverse nutrient, temperature, osmotic, oxygen, and light conditions. The cells that are in the VBNC state are morphologically smaller, and demonstrate reduced nutrient transport, rate of respiration, and synthesis of macromolecules. Sometimes, VBNC bacteria can remain in that state for over a year. It has been shown that numerous pathogens and non-pathogens can enter the VBNC state, and therefore it has significant implications in pathogenesis, bioremediation, and other branches of microbiology.

The existence of the VBNC state is controversial.  The validity and interpretation of the assays to determine the VBNC state have been questioned.

VBNC pathogens
Species known to enter a VBNC state:

E.M.S
Aeromonas salmonicida
Agrobacterium tumefaciens
Burkholderia cepacia
Burkholderia pseudomallei
Brettanomyces bruxellensis
Campylobacter coli
Campylobacter jejuni
Campylobacter lari
Cytophaga allerginae
Enterobacter aerogenes
Enterobacter cloacae
Enterococcus faecalis
Enterococcus hirae
Enterococcus faecium
Erwinia amylovora
Escherichia coli (including EHEC)
Francisella tularensis
Helicobacter pylori
Klebsiella aerogenes
Klebsiella pneumoniae
Klebsiella planticola
Legionella pneumophila
Listeria monocytogenes
Micrococcus luteus
Mycobacterium tuberculosis
Mycobacterium smegmatis
Pasteurella piscicida
Pseudomonas aeruginosa
Pseudomonas syringae
Pseudomonas putida KT2440
Ralstonia solanacearum
Rhizobium leguminosarum
Rhizobium meliloti
Salmonella enterica
Salmonella Typhi
Salmonella Typhimurium
Serratia marcescens
Shigella dysenteriae
Shigella flexneri
Shigella sonnei
Streptococcus faecalis
Vibrio anguillarum
Vibrio campbellii
Vibrio cholerae
Vibrio harveyi
Vibrio mimicus
Vibrio parahaemolyticus
Vibrio shiloi
Vibrio vulnificus (types 1 and 2)
Xanthomonas campestris
Xanthomonas axonopodis pv. citri
Yersinia pestis

References

Bacteria
Bacteriology